The 2019 OFC Champions League Final was the final match of the 2019 OFC Champions League, the 18th edition of the Oceanian Club Championship, Oceania's premier club football tournament organized by the Oceania Football Confederation (OFC), and the 13th season under the current OFC Champions League name.

The final was contested as a single match between New Caledonian teams Magenta and Hienghène Sport. The match took place at the Stade Numa-Daly Magenta in Nouméa on 11 May 2019.

Hienghène Sport won the final 1–0 for their first OFC Champions League title.

Teams
In the following table, finals until 2006 were in the Oceania Club Championship era, since 2007 were in the OFC Champions League era.

The final was the first all-New Caledonian final, and guaranteed that for the first time that the OFC club champions were from New Caledonia. This was also the first final since 2005 not to feature a team from New Zealand, and the first ever not to feature any team from New Zealand or Australia (which left the OFC after 2005).

Venue
The Stade Numa-Daly Magenta was the venue for the final. This was the first time that the stadium hosted an OFC Champions League final.

Road to the final

Note: In all results below, the score of the finalist is given first (H: home; A: away; N: neutral).

Format
In the final, the two semi-final winners played each other, with the host team decided by draw, which was held on 5 March 2019 at the OFC Headquarters in Auckland, New Zealand. Based on the draw, Magenta (winner of semi-final 2) were the home team.

If the match was level at the end of 90 minutes of normal playing time, extra time would be played (two periods of 15 minutes each), where each team would be allowed to make a fourth substitution. If still tied after extra time, the match would be decided by a penalty shoot-out to determine the winners.

Match

Details

References

External links
 

2019
Final
May 2019 sports events in Oceania
AS Magenta
Hienghène Sport
2019 in New Caledonian football
Sports competitions in Nouméa
21st century in Nouméa
International association football competitions hosted by New Caledonia